Phamous is Indian Hindi-language romantic crime film directed by Karan Lalit Butani and produced by Raj Khatri, Vidisha Productions and Amitabh Chandra. The film stars Jimmy Sheirgill, Shriya Saran, Kay Kay Menon, Pankaj Tripathi, Jackie Shroff and Mahie Gill in leading roles and was scheduled to a theatrical release in India on 1 June 2018. The Official Trailer of the movie was released on YouTube on 26 April 2018.

Plot 
The story of Phamous is set in the Chambal region of Madhya Pradesh with a power struggle between the four principal characters forming the crux of its story. Phamous is the fourth Indian film to be shot in the Chambal region, which is famous for its association with dacoits, the first being Mujhe Jeene Do which was shot in 1963, as well as Dacait, Bandit Queen and Paan Singh Tomar.

Shambhu (Jackie) accidentally kills his own daughter on her wedding day while saving her from being kidnapped by Kadak Singh (Kay Kay), and his actions lands him in prison. He swears vengeance.

Radhe (Jimmy) idolises gun wielding, local politician Kadak Singh and dreams of possessing a weapon of his own. Kadak is indebted to Radhe who had saved his life as a young boy.

Kadak and Ram Vijay Tripathi (Pankaj Tripathi) are bedfellows in the political game. Kadak rules the roost with crooked politicians Tripathi and his brother Babban (Jameel Khan).

Radhe has an old grudge against Tripathi as years ago, Radhe as a student was infatuated with his teacher, Rosie (Mahie Gill). Tripathi, who was high on libido, raped and murdered Rosie teacher.

Kadak Singh still manages to work with both until Tripathi sets his lecherous eyes on Radhe's wife Lalli (Shriya Saran). Radhe has to make a choice and is forced to train his guns on Tripathi. What ensues is the battle of supremacy and a revenge drama, as Shambhu is back to avenge his daughter's death. Good prevails over evil, as the self proclaimed dhaakad Phamous Raavan meets his end.

Cast 
 Jimmy Sheirgill as Radhe Shyam
 Shriya Saran as Lalli
 Kay Kay Menon as Kadak Singh
 Pankaj Tripathi as Ram Vijay Tripathi
 Jackie Shroff as Shambhu Singh
 Mahie Gill as Teacher Rozy
 Brijendra Kala as cop
 Jameel Khan as Babban, Tripathi's brother
 Karan Patel as Goli, local goon and Radhe's friend
 Satyadeep Mishra as Lalli's ex-boyfriend
 Padmavati Rao as Lall's mother

Production

Development 
The film was produced by Raj Khatri, Amitabh Chandra, Sunit Jawadekar and Nivedita Kothare under the banner of Vidisha Productions, Raj Khatri Filmz and OM Reels. The official trailer of the film was launched on 26 April 2018.

Filming 
The shooting of the film has been done in Madhya Pradesh. The shooting of the film in Chambal has been done in Chambal Valley.

Soundtrack 

The soundtrack of Phamous consists of 3 songs composed by Krsna Solo, Sundeep Gosswami & Surya Vishwakarma with the lyrics being written by Puneet Sharma and Naveen Tyagi.

Release 
This film was released on 1 June 2018 in India.

Critical reception 
The film received mixed reviews from critics; while some commentators praised the humour.
Shubhra Gupta of The Indian Express gave the film 1 stars out of 5; she wrote that For lack of a better descriptor, Phamous can be said to be about men and moustaches. The kind of men who lord over the arid hillocks of the Chambal, who shower more affection on their ‘mooch’ than their ‘mashooka’. Or should we hazard the guess that their ‘mooch’ is their ‘mashooka’?

References

External links 
 
 

2010s Hindi-language films
2010s masala films
2018 crime films
2018 films
2018 Western (genre) films
Films set in Madhya Pradesh
Films scored by Krsna Solo
Indian crime drama films
Indian Western (genre) films
Neo-Western films
Romantic crime films